Jim Skow (born June 29, 1963) is a former American football defensive end who played seven seasons in the National Football League (NFL). He finished his career with 24 sacks and one fumble recovery. His best season was in 1988, recording 9.5 sacks and helping the Bengals reach Super Bowl XXIII, where he recorded several tackles and a fumble recovery. After retiring from the NFL, he attended law school and received his Juris Doctor from Stetson University in 1996.  He currently is in private practice in Daytona Beach.  

1963 births
Living people
American football defensive ends
Nebraska Cornhuskers football players
Cincinnati Bengals players
Tampa Bay Buccaneers players
Seattle Seahawks players
San Diego Chargers players
St. Louis Rams players